Väderstads IK is a sports club in Väderstad, Sweden, established in 1938.

The women's soccer team played in the Swedish top division in 1980 and 1981.

References

External links
Väderstads IK 

Football clubs in Östergötland County
Sports clubs established in 1938
Defunct bandy clubs in Sweden
Orienteering clubs in Sweden
1938 establishments in Sweden
Sport in Östergötland County
Ski clubs in Sweden